Orbit Books is an international publisher that specialises in science fiction and fantasy books. It is a division of Lagardère Publishing.

History
It was founded in 1974 as part of the Macdonald Futura publishing company. In 1992, its parent company was bought by Little, Brown & Co., at that stage part of the Time Warner Book Group. In 1997, Orbit acquired the Legend imprint from Random House.

In 2006, Orbit's parent company Little, Brown was sold by Time Warner to the French publishing group Hachette Livre.

In summer 2006, it was announced that Orbit would expand internationally, with the establishment of Orbit imprints in the United States and Australia. Orbit Publishing Director Tim Holman relocated to New York to establish Orbit US as an imprint of Hachette Book Group USA. In June 2007, Orbit announced the appointment of Bernadette Foley as publisher for Orbit Australia, an imprint of Hachette Livre Australia.
In 2009 Orbit expanded to France, used by the editor Calman Levy.

In 2020, the popularity of the Netflix show The Witcher had the publisher reprint all the titles of the Witcher series by Polish author Andrzej Sapkowski.

Authors

 Rachel Aaron
 Joe Abercrombie
 Daniel Abraham (also as M. L. N. Hanover)
 Brian W. Aldiss
 Kevin J. Anderson
 Kelley Armstrong
 Luke Arnold
 Stephen Aryan
 Paolo Bacigalupi
 R. Scott Bakker
 Josiah Bancroft
 Iain M. Banks
 Robert Jackson Bennett
 Patricia Briggs
 David Brin
 Terry Brooks
 Robert Buettner
 Jesse Bullington
 Jim Butcher
 Trudi Canavan
 Orson Scott Card
 Mike Carey
 Amanda Carlson
 Gail Carriger
 Heather Child
 James Clemens
 Michael Cobley
 James S. A. Corey
 David Dalglish
 Marianne de Pierres
 Terry DeHart
 Amanda Downum
 Nicholas Eames
 Kate Elliott
 David Farland
 Charlie Fletcher
 Pamela Freeman
 Celia Friedman
 John R. Fultz
 Ian Graham
 Jo Graham
 Mira Grant
 Kate Griffin
 Jon Courtenay Grimwood
 Laurell K. Hamilton
 Kevin Hearne
 Barb and J. C. Hendee
 Tanya Huff
 Charlie Huston
 Ian Irvine
 James Islington
 Trent Jamieson
 N. K. Jemisin
 J. V. Jones
 Celine Kiernan
 Russell Kirkpatrick
 Mur Lafferty
 Glenda Larke
 Tim Lebbon
 Ann Leckie
 Marjorie M. Liu
 Helen Lowe
 Ken MacLeod
 Devin Madson
 Gail Z. Martin
 T. C. McCarthy
 Fiona McIntosh
 Karen Miller
 Elizabeth Moon
 Christopher Moore
 Simon Morden
 Rachel Neumeier
 Annalee Newitz
 Kristen Painter
 Philip Palmer
 K. J. Parker
 Nicole Peeler
 Jennifer Rardin
 Andy Remic
 Kim Stanley Robinson
 Brian Ruckley
 Lilith Saintcrow
 Brandon Sanderson
 Andrzej Sapkowski
 Joel Shepherd
 Jeff Somers
 Allen Steele
 Charles Stross
 Michael J. Sullivan
 Tricia Sullivan
 Tasha Suri
 Tade Thompson
 Karen Traviss
 Angus Watson
 Brent Weeks
 Jaye Wells
 Sean Williams
 Tad Williams
 Walter Jon Williams
 Evan Winter

References

External links 

American speculative fiction publishers
British speculative fiction publishers
Fantasy book publishers
Science fiction publishers
Publishing companies established in 1974
1974 establishments in England
Lagardère Media